Ornsay is a small tidal island to the east of the Sleat peninsula on the Isle of Skye in the Inner Hebrides of Scotland.

Description
The island provides good shelter to a natural harbour which is overlooked by the village of Isleornsay. The "Ornsay" lighthouse stands on the neighbouring islet, Eilean Sionnach. After the lighthouse was automated, Eilean Sionnach Lighthouse Keeper's Cottage became privately owned and is now let as holiday accommodation.

Lighthouse
The lighthouse was built in 1857 by Thomas and David Stevenson. It is a masonry tower with a gallery, lantern and keeper's house. The apparatus entered service on 10 November 1857. The lens system was improved in order to show the light strength according to the distance to be shown. The lighthouse is equipped with a fourteen-day battery backup to keep the emergency light working. It was modernized in 1988 when mains power was installed. The lighthouse emits a white occulting light every 8 seconds and was automated in 1962.

See also
 List of lighthouses in Scotland
 List of Northern Lighthouse Board lighthouses

References

External links
 Northern Lighthouse Board 

Uninhabited islands of Highland (council area)